The Laura Recovery Center is a non-profit organization that works to prevent kidnappings and abductions and to recover victims of such events. The center is located in Friendswood, Texas, and is named for Laura Kate Smither (April 23, 1984 – April 3, 1997), a 12-year-old girl who was abducted near her Friendswood home and murdered.

History
The center was established by Smither's parents, Bob and Gay Smither, in April 1998 in response to their daughter's murder. On April 3, 1997, Laura Smither was abducted near her home while she was jogging. After her disappearance, more than 6,000 volunteers searched over 800 square miles (2,000 km²). Her body was discovered seventeen days later, on April 20, in a regional water retention pond ten miles from her home. In 2016, William Reece was indicted on charges of murdering Smither, and other missing Texas girls, and in 2021 he was sentenced to death.

The center originally focused on education, training law enforcement and organized community searches related to child abduction and child safety, but as of 2013 is no longer active in recovering missing children.

Searches
The Laura Recovery Center has organized numerous community led searches for abducted children, including those for Danielle van Dam and Morgan Harrington. The search for van Dam was the group's first out-of-state effort and was one of the largest volunteer search efforts in Californian history, with hundreds of volunteers searching deserts, highways and remote areas for weeks. A volunteer party organized by the Center found her body.

References

External links

 

Foundations based in the United States
Child safety
Missing people organizations